Neptunite is a silicate mineral with the formula KNa2Li(Fe2+, Mn2+)2Ti2Si8O24. With increasing manganese it forms a series with mangan-neptunite. Watatsumiite is the variety with vanadium replacing the titanium in the formula.

It was first described in 1893 for an occurrence in the Narssârssuk pegmatite of West Greenland. It is also found within natrolite veins in glaucophane schist within serpentinite in San Benito County, California, US. It also occurs in Mont Saint-Hilaire, Quebec and in the Kola Peninsula of Russia.
 
The mineral is named for Neptune, Roman god of the sea because of its association with aegirine from Àgir, the Scandinavian sea-god.

The Gemological Institute of America (GIA) identified an 11.78-carat faceted specimen as neptunite based on Raman spectroscopy.

References

Phyllosilicates
Potassium minerals
Lithium minerals
Sodium minerals
Titanium minerals
Monoclinic minerals
Minerals in space group 9